Road 21 is a road in west and north-west Iran. It connects western province capitals to each other and to Azerbaijan border.

References

External links 

 Iran roads map on Young Journalists Club

21
Transportation in Ilam Province
Transportation in East Azerbaijan Province
Transportation in West Azerbaijan Province